Prudence Crandall (September 3, 1803 – January 27, 1890) was an American schoolteacher and activist. She ran the first school for black girls ("young Ladies and little Misses of color") in the United States, located in Canterbury, Connecticut.

When Crandall admitted Sarah Harris, a 20-year-old African-American female student in 1832 to her school, she had what is considered the first integrated classroom in the United States. Parents of the white children began to withdraw them. Prudence was a "very obstinate girl", according to her brother Reuben. Rather than ask the African-American student to leave, she decided that if white girls would not attend with the black students, she would educate black girls. She was arrested and spent a night in jail. Soon the violence of the townspeople forced her to close the school. She left Connecticut and never lived there again.

Much later the Connecticut legislature, with lobbying from Mark Twain, a resident of Hartford, passed a resolution honoring Crandall and providing her with a pension. Twain offered to buy her former Canterbury home for her retirement, but she declined. She died a few years later, in 1890.

In 1995 the Connecticut General Assembly named her the Official Heroine of Connecticut.

Early life 
Prudence Crandall was born on September 3, 1803, to Pardon and Esther Carpenter Crandall, a Quaker couple who lived in Carpenter's Mills, Rhode Island. Reuben was her younger brother. When she was about 10, her father moved the family to nearby Canterbury, Connecticut. Her teacher there, Rowland Greene, was opposed to slavery, and much later gave an address, published in William Lloyd Garrison's The Liberator, on the necessity of education for blacks, and commended Isaac C. Glasgow for sending two of his daughters, "exemplary young women", to Crandall's school for young ladies of color.

When 22, for one year she attended the New England Yearly Meeting School, a Quaker boarding school in Providence, Rhode Island. That the school existed was due to the generosity of Moses Brown, an abolitionist and co-founder of Brown University; in 1904 the school renamed itself the Moses Brown School. After graduating, Prudence Crandall taught a school in Plainfield. She became a Baptist in 1830.

Establishment of the boarding school 

In 1831 she purchased the Elisha Payne house, with her sister Almira Crandall, to establish the Canterbury Female Boarding School, at the request of Canterbury's aristocratic residents, to educate young girls in the town. With the help of her sister and a maid, she taught about forty children in different subjects including geography, history, grammar, arithmetic, reading, and writing. As principal of the female boarding school, Prudence Crandall was deemed successful in her ability to educate young girls, and the school flourished until September 1832.

Integration of the boarding school 

Although Prudence Crandall grew up as a North American Quaker, she admitted that she was not acquainted with many black people or abolitionists.  She discovered the problems that plagued black people through the abolitionist newspaper The Liberator, which she learned of through her housekeeper, "a young black lady", whose fiancé was the son of the paper's local agent. After reading The Liberator, Prudence Crandall said in an earlier account that she  "contemplated for a while, the manner in which I might best serve the people of color."

Prudence Crandall's chance to help people of color came in the fall of 1832. Sarah Harris, the daughter of a free African-American farmer near Canterbury, asked to be accepted to the school to prepare for teaching other African Americans. Although Crandall was uncertain about whether to admit Harris, whom she liked, she consulted her Bible, which, as she told it, came open to Ecclesiastes 4:1:

She then admitted the girl, establishing the first integrated school in the United States. Prominent townspeople objected and placed pressure on Crandall to dismiss Harris from the school, but she refused. Although the white students in the school did not openly oppose the presence of Sarah Harris, families of the current white students removed their daughters from the school.

Consequently, Crandall devoted herself to teaching African-American girls, after traveling to Boston to consult with abolitionists Samuel J. May and William Lloyd Garrison about the project. (Both were supportive, and gave her letters of introduction to prominent African Americans in locations from Providence, Rhode Island, to New York. She temporarily closed the school and began directly recruiting new students of color. On March 2, 1833, Garrison published advertisements for new pupils in his newspaper The Liberator. Crandall announced that on the first Monday of April 1833, she would open a school "for the reception of young Ladies and little Misses of color, ... Terms, $25 per quarter, one half paid in advance." Her references included leading abolitionists Arthur Tappan, May, and Garrison.

As word of the school spread, African-American families began arranging enrollment of their daughters in Crandall's academy. On April 1, 1833, twenty African-American girls from Boston, Providence, New York, Philadelphia, and the surrounding areas in Connecticut arrived at Miss Crandall's School for Young Ladies and Little Misses of Color.

Public backlash 
Leading the opposition to Crandall's school for black girls was her neighbor Andrew Judson, an attorney and Canterbury's leading politician, having represented it in both the Connecticut House and Senate, and would soon be Connecticut's at-large member of the U.S. House of Representatives. In the national debate that was awkwardly taking place over "what to do" with the freed or soon-to-be-freed slaves, Judson supported "colonization": sending them to (not "back to") Africa (see American Colonization Society). He said: "We are not merely opposed to the establishment of that school in Canterbury; we mean there shall not be such a school set up anywhere in our State. The colored people can never rise from their menial condition in our country; they ought not to be permitted to rise here. They are an inferior race of beings, and never call or ought to be recognized as the equals of the whites." "He predicted the destruction of the town if Crandall's school for colored children succeeded." Judson was also involved in efforts to capture David Garrison and turn him over to Southerners; there was a $10,000 reward.

In response to the new school, a committee of four prominent white men in the town, Rufus Adams, Daniel Frost Jr., Andrew Harris, and Richard Fenner, attempted to convince Crandall that her school for young women of color would be detrimental to the safety of the white people in the town of Canterbury. Frost claimed that the boarding school would encourage "social equality and intermarriage of whites and blacks." To this, her response was "Moses had a black wife."

At first, citizens of Canterbury protested the school and then held town meetings "to devise and adopt such measures as would effectually avert the nuisance, or speedily abate it." The town response escalated into warnings, threats, and acts of violence against the school. Crandall was faced with great local opposition, and her detractors had no plans to back down.

On May 24, 1833, the Connecticut legislature passed a "Black Law", which prohibited a school from teaching African-American students from outside the state without town permission. In July, Crandall was arrested and placed in the county jail for one night—she refused to be bonded out, as she wished the public to know she was being jailed. (A Vermont newspaper reported it under the headline "Shame on Connecticut".) The next day she was released under bond to await her trial.

Under the Black Law, the townspeople refused any amenities to the students or Crandall, closing their shops and meeting houses to them, although they were welcomed at Prudence's Baptist church, in neighboring Plainfield. Stage drivers refused to provide them with transportation, and the town doctors refused to treat them. Townspeople poisoned the school's well—its only water source—with animal feces, and prevented Crandall from obtaining water from other sources. Not only did Crandall and her students receive backlash, but her father was also insulted and threatened by the citizens of Canterbury. Although she faced extreme difficulties, Crandall continued to teach the young women of color which angered the community even further.

Crandall's students also suffered. Ann Eliza Hammond, a 17-year-old student, was arrested; however, with the help of local abolitionist Samuel J. May, she was able to post a bail bond. Some $10,000 was raised through collections and donations.

Judicial proceedings 
Arthur Tappan of New York, a prominent abolitionist, donated $10,000 to hire the best lawyers to defend Crandall throughout her trials. The first opened at the Windham County Court on August 23, 1833. The case challenged the constitutionality of the Connecticut law prohibiting the education of African Americans from outside the state.

The defense argued that African Americans were citizens in other states, so, therefore, there was no reason why they should not be considered as such in Connecticut. Thus, they focused on the deprivation of the rights of African-American students under the United States Constitution. By contrast, the prosecution denied the fact that freed African-Americans were citizens in any state. The county court jury ultimately failed to reach a decision for the cases.

A second trial in Superior Court decided against the school, and the case was taken to the Supreme Court of Errors (now called the Connecticut Supreme Court) on appeal in July 1834. The Connecticut high court reversed the decision of the lower court, dismissing the case on July 22 because of a procedural defect.  The Black Law prohibited the education of black children from outside of Connecticut unless permission was granted by the local civil authority and town selectmen.  But the prosecution's information that charged Crandall had not alleged that she had established her school without the permission of the civil authority and selectmen of Canterbury.  Therefore, the Supreme Court held that the information was fatally defective because the conduct which it alleged did not constitute a crime. The Court did not address the issue of whether the citizenship of free African Americans had to be recognized in every state.

The judicial process had not stopped the operation of the Canterbury boarding school, but the townspeople's vandalism against it increased. The residents of Canterbury were so angry that the court had dismissed the case that vandals set the school on fire in January 1834, but they failed in their attempts to destroy the school. On September 9, 1834, a group of townspeople broke almost ninety  window glass panes using heavy iron bars.  For the safety of her students, her family and herself, Prudence Crandall closed her school on September 10, 1834.

Connecticut officially repealed the Black Law in 1838.

Later years 
At the suggestion of William Garrison, who raised the money from "various antislavery societies", Francis Alexander painted a portrait of Crandall in April 1834. She had to go to Boston for the sittings, where she "became the center of attention at abolitionist parties and gatherings each evening. The Boston abolitionists honored her as a true heroine of the antislavery cause."

In August 1834, Crandall married the Rev. Calvin Philleo, a Baptist minister in Canterbury, Connecticut. The couple moved to Massachusetts for a period of time after they fled the town of Canterbury, and they also lived in New York, Rhode Island, and Illinois. Crandall was involved in the women's suffrage movement and ran a school in LaSalle County, Illinois.  She separated from Philleo in 1842 after his "deteriorating physical and mental health" led him to be abusive.  He died in Illinois in 1874.

After the death of her husband, Crandall relocated with her brother Hezekiah to Elk Falls, Kansas, around 1877, and it was there that her brother eventually died in 1881. A visitor of 1886, who described her as "of almost national renown," with "a host of good books in her house", quoted her as follows:

In 1886, the state of Connecticut honored Prudence Crandall with an act by the legislature, prominently supported by the writer Mark Twain, providing her with a $400 annual pension. Prudence Crandall died in Kansas on January 28, 1890, at the age of 86. She and her brother Hezekiah are buried in Elk Falls Cemetery.

Prudence Crandall's brother Reuben 

Prudence's younger brother Reuben was a physician and a botany expert. He was no abolitionist and was opposed to Prudence's efforts to educate African-American girls, and told this to her chief enemy Judson, when the latter gave him a ride.

Reuben, who had studied medicine at Yale and practiced for 7 years in Peekskill, New York, was arrested on August 10, 1835, in Washington, D.C., and charged with sedition and publication of abolitionist literature. He narrowly escaped being lynched. At first denied bail, it was later set so high that he could not meet it, and he was jailed for 8 months before his trial. It was the first trial for sedition in the history of the country, and being in Washington it attracted a large audience, including members of Congress and reporters. Francis Scott Key was the District of Columbia prosecuting attorney. The jury acquitted Reuben of all charges; this was a major public embarrassment for Key and ended his political career. However, Reuben contracted tuberculosis while in jail and died shortly thereafter.

Prudence's sister Almira died in 1837. In 1838 her father Pardon died, followed days later by her sister-in-law Clarissa, who had just given birth.

Legacy

19th century 
 An oil portrait of her by Francis Alexander was commissioned by her supporters in 1834. It is at Cornell University. A printed copy is in the Prudence Crandall Museum.

 The Glasgow Emancipation Society prepared the following piece of "plate" (silver), which a traveler to the U.S. was going to take to her:

20th century 
In the late 20th century, Crandall received renewed attention and honors:
 On February 21, 1965, the NBC television series Profiles in Courage broadcast an episode about her.
The Prudence Crandall House in Canterbury was acquired by the State of Connecticut in 1969. Now a Connecticut state museum, it was declared a National Historic Landmark in 1991.
 In 1973, the Prudence Crandall Center for Women, since 2003 the Prudence Crandall Center, Inc., was founded in New Britain, Connecticut, to provide shelter for victims of domestic violence.
Crandall was the subject of a Walt Disney/NBC television movie entitled She Stood Alone (1991), in which she was portrayed by actress Mare Winningham.
In 1994 Crandall was inducted into the Connecticut Women's Hall of Fame.
In 1995, the Connecticut General Assembly designated Prudence Crandall as the state's official heroine.
The Prudence Crandall Elementary School in Enfield, Connecticut, opened in 1966.
 In 2001 Crandall was inducted into the Rhode Island Heritage Hall of Fame.
In 2008, a statue of Crandall and a pupil was erected in the Connecticut state capital.

Historical marker 
The following marker is at  Osage Street and U.S. Route 160, Elk Falls, Kansas:

Archival material 
The Linda Lear Center for Special Collections & Archives, at Connecticut College, in New London, Connecticut, has a Prudence Crandall Collection. It contains "23 letters and one manuscript of poems by Crandall, including three letters to the abolitionist Simeon Jocelyn detailing the opposition to her school. Most of the remaining letters are to her husband, Calvin Philleo. There are also nearly three dozen manuscripts of correspondence and business records of Philleo. The remainder of the collection consists of photographs of Crandall, her family members, and their places of residence and Helen Sellers' research materials and correspondence related to her biography."  The Lear Center has also posted a guide to other archival material of or relating to Crandall.

Correspondence with William Garrison is in his papers in the Boston Public Library.

References

Further reading

External links 

Jennifer Rycenga gives a talk on Prudence Crandall, 2018 April 14, 2018, Otis Library, Norwich, Connecticut. Rycenga has published an article on Crandall (reference above) and is at work on a biography.
"From Canterbury to Little Rock: The Struggle for Educational Equality for African Americans", a National Park Service Teaching with Historic Places (TwHP) lesson plan

"Hezekiah Crandall" (sister), Find a Grave.
 Find a Grave

1803 births
1890 deaths
People from Hopkinton, Rhode Island
American Quakers
Activists for African-American civil rights
American educators
School desegregation pioneers
Symbols of Connecticut
Education in Connecticut
People from Canterbury, Connecticut
People from Washington County, Rhode Island
American suffragists
African-American history of Connecticut
African Americans and education
Moses Brown School alumni
Prudence Crandall
Women civil rights activists
American school principals
Founders of schools in the United States